Bikovo is a village located in the Subotica municipality, in the North Bačka District of Serbia. It is situated in the autonomous province of Vojvodina. The village is ethnically mixed and its population numbering 1,824 people (2002 census).

Name
In Serbian the village is known as Биково or Bikovo, in Croatian as Bikovo, in Bunjevac as Bikovo, in Hungarian as Békova, and in German as Békovinenstadt.

Ethnic groups (2002)
Croats = 563 (30.87%)
Serbs = 421 (23.08%)
Bunjevci = 411 (22.53%)
Hungarians = 259 (14.20%)
Yugoslavs = 78 (4.28%)

Historical population
1961: 3,236
1971: 2,786
1981: 2,203
1991: 1,942

References

Slobodan Ćurčić, Broj stanovnika Vojvodine, Novi Sad, 1996.

See also
List of places in Serbia
List of cities, towns and villages in Vojvodina

Places in Bačka
Subotica
Bunjevci